The Ring of the Fisherman (Latin: Anulus piscatoris; Italian: Anello Piscatorio), also known as the Piscatory Ring, is an official part of the regalia worn by the Pope, who is head of the Catholic Church and successor of Saint Peter, who was a fisherman by trade. It used to feature a bas-relief of Peter fishing from a boat, a symbolism derived from the tradition that the apostles were "fishers of men" (Mark 1:17). The Fisherman's Ring is a signet used until 1842 to seal official documents signed by the Pope. Since at least the Middle Ages it has been a tradition for Catholics meeting the Pope to show their devotion by kissing the ring.

History
A letter written by Pope Clement IV to his nephew Pietro Grossi in 1265 includes the earliest known mention of the Ring of the Fisherman, which was used for sealing all the pope's private correspondence. Public documents, by contrast, were sealed by stamping a different papal seal onto lead which was attached to the document. Such documents were historically called papal bulls, named after the stamped bulla (seal) of lead.

Use of the Fisherman's Ring changed during the 15th century when it was used to seal official documents called papal briefs. That practice ended in 1842, when the sealing wax was replaced by a stamp which affixed the same device in red ink.

Creation, transfer, and destruction

A new ring is cast for each Pope as a general practice in tradition. Around the relief image is the reigning Pope's Latin name. During the ceremony of a Papal coronation or Papal inauguration, the Camerlengo traditionally slips the ring on the ring finger of the new Pope's right hand. Benedict XVI had the Dean of the College of Cardinals give him the ring, which he then placed upon himself. Pope Francis was bestowed his ring by Cardinal Sodano at his installation.

Upon a papal death, the ring used to be ceremonially destroyed using a hammer in the presence of other cardinals by the Camerlengo. This was done to prevent issuance of forged documents during the sede vacante. Today, the destruction of the ring's device with deep scratches is a symbol of the end of rule of the pope who used to wear that ring. This custom was followed after the resignation of Pope Benedict XVI by applying two deep cuts, in the shape of a cross, on the signet with a chisel.

Wear

Although Pope Benedict XVI wore his Fisherman's Ring daily, it is no longer the custom for popes to wear it at all. Generally, a new pope will either inherit the daily-wear ring of his predecessor, keep an old ring of his own preference, or will choose a new daily-wear style. Pope John Paul I usually wore a wide gold band similar in design to the mitre-shaped Second Vatican Council ring; in imitation of this, Pope John Paul II wore a wide gold crucifix shaped into a ring that had belonged to Pope Paul VI.

In former times, a special coronation ring was placed on the pope's finger, designed very large since it was worn over the pope's glove. That custom and the use of a coronation ring ended with Pope Paul VI.

Generally, popes of the past wore episcopal rings in keeping with the fashions of the time. Pope Pius XII, for example, often wore a heavily ornate ring set with a stone. Pope Pius IX most often wore a cameo of himself, made entirely of tiny diamonds, whilst Pope Pius X wore a simple, smaller stone-set ring. In keeping with the modern spirit suggested by Pope John XXIII and actually practiced in his later years by Pope Paul VI, Pope Francis only wears a simple gold-plated silver ring for papal ceremonies, preferring to wear a small silver ring from his days as a cardinal.

References

External links

 The Piscatory Ring (Anulus piscatoris) of Pope Benedict XVI.

Papal vestments
Seals (insignia)
Individual rings